Darin Godfrey Jordan (born December 4, 1964) is a former American football linebacker who played four seasons in the National Football League (NFL) with the Pittsburgh Steelers and San Francisco 49ers. He was drafted by the Pittsburgh Steelers in the fifth round of the 1988 NFL Draft. He played college football at Northeastern University and attended Stoughton High School in Stoughton, Massachusetts. He has also been a member of the Los Angeles Raiders.

Early life
Jordan was born on December 4, 1964, in Boston, Massachusetts. He attended Stoughton High School, where he lettered in track and football, captained the football team, and was selected All Hockomock League as both a junior and senior. Before enrolling at Northeastern University, Jordan worked with his uncle for three summers cleaning all the Venetian blinds, which he said helped him get "a close feeling for the school and the people in it."

At Northeastern, Jordan majored in speech communication and was "one of the premier defensive linemen in Huskies history." He was redshirted as a freshman in 1983, but was in the starting lineup by the fourth game of 1984. By the conclusion of his rookie season, Jordan finished with a total of 24 tackles and two quarterback sacks.

Career
Jordan was drafted by the Pittsburgh Steelers in the fifth round of the 1988 NFL Draft. He was released by the Steelers before their first game of the season and was signed shortly thereafter by the Raiders. After three days with the Raiders he was released for he "did not know their system." As a Plan B free agent, he was signed by the San Francisco 49ers.

During the 1994–95 pre-season, Jordan was released by the 49ers on waivers. Prior to re-signing, he kept in shape by skating with former members of the San Jose Sharks for he had played pickup hockey until the 10th grade after basketball practice. In January 1995, Jordan was signed by San Francisco as a special teams player and backup linebacker to replace Anthony Peterson on injured reserve. When speaking of the decision, vice president for football administration John McVay said "he's been here before so it's not like he's a stranger to these players." He played his first game of the season in  Super Bowl XXIX against the Chargers on their special team.

Personal life
Jordan was married to Andrea Hayes-Jordan, the first pediatric surgeon to perform a high-risk, life-saving procedure in children with a rare form of cancer. They have two children together, a son and daughter. After retiring from football, Jordan inspects game balls and uniforms for NRG Stadium under contract of the NFL.

References

External links
Just Sports Stats
Fanbase profile

Living people
1964 births
Players of American football from Boston
American football linebackers
American football defensive ends
African-American players of American football
Northeastern Huskies football players
Pittsburgh Steelers players
Los Angeles Raiders players
San Francisco 49ers players
21st-century African-American people
20th-century African-American sportspeople